The Spanish Cognitive Linguistics Association AELCO-SCOLA) was founded in Alicante in 1998.
Its main goal is to encourage research related to the study of language from the viewpoint of Cognitive Linguistics in Spain.

International conferences
AELCO-SCOLA organises international conferences every two years since 1998 at different universities in Spain. So far, conferences have held at
 University of Alicante 1998
 Complutense University of Madrid 2000
 University of Valencia 2002
 University of Zaragoza 2004
 University of Murcia 2006
 University of Jaume I, Castellón 2008
 University of Castilla-La Mancha (Toledo) 2010
 University of Almería 2012
 University of Extremadura (Badajoz) 2014

International journal
The Journal of the Association is the Review of Cognitive Linguistics published by John Benjamins and with an impact factor 0.571.

External links 
 Spanish Cognitive Linguistics Association.
Review of Cognitive Linguistics

Scientific societies based in Spain
Linguistic societies